Otto Lehmann-Russbüldt (1 January 1873, Berlin – 7 October 1964) was a German pacifist activist and writer.

Publications 
German:
 (1919) Jung-Frühling (autobiographical novel), Berlin
 (1922) Die Brücke über den Abgrund. Für die Verständigung zwischen Deutschland und Frankreich, Berlin
 (1926) Carl Mertens, Otto Lehmann-Rußbüldt, Konrad Widerhold : Die deutsche Militärpolitik seit 1918, Berlin
 (1926) Der Kampf der Deutschen Liga für Menschenrechte, vormals Bund Neues Vaterland, für den Weltfrieden 1914–1927, Berlin
 (1929) Die blutige Internationale der Rüstungsindustrie, Berlin
English:
 (1936) Hitler's wings of death New York: Telegraph Press; Germany's air force London: G. Allen & Unwin
 (1942) Aggression: The origin of Germany's war machine, London: Hutchinson

References

1873 births
1964 deaths
Writers from Berlin
People from the Province of Brandenburg
German Peace Society members
German activists
German male writers